Amina Bughra was a Uyghur politician in China. She was one of the first group of women elected to the Legislative Yuan in 1948.

Biography
Bughra married Uyghur leader Muhammad Amin Bughra. She became deputy chair of the Xinjian Women's Association, and was a member of the Constitutional National Assembly that drew up the Constitution of the Republic of China. She was subsequently elected to the Legislative Yuan in the 1948 elections. After being elected, she sat on the Political and Local Self-Government Committee, the Foreign Affairs Committee and the Border Committee. She resigned from the Legislative Yuan in 1955.

References

Members of the 1st Legislative Yuan
20th-century Chinese women politicians
Uyghur politicians
Members of the Kuomintang
Year of birth unknown
Year of death unknown